"Neon Rainbow" is a song written by Wayne Carson Thompson and made famous by Memphis blue-eyed soul band The Box Tops.

About
The track is featured on The Letter/Neon Rainbow. The song starts with the lyrics "The city lights, the pretty lights, They can warm the coldest nights" and as they suggest, the song is about neon signs that come on at night and make even the city's coldest nights seem warm. The lyrics continue "But in the daytime everything changes, Nothing remains the same. No one smiles anymore, And no one will open his door. Until the night time comes. And then the..." suggesting that the city's inhabitants stay inside during the day and come out only at night.

Billboard described the single as a "swinging rhythm item with compelling lyric."

Petula Clark recorded the song for her 1970 album Memphis and Rita Pavone made an Italian version with the title "Il mondo nelle mani" (The world in the hands).

Personnel
Alex Chilton – vocals
Bobby Womack – acoustic guitar
Other instrumentation by The Memphis Boys
Gene Chrisman – drums
Tommy Cogbill – bass guitar
Bobby Emmons – piano, Vox Continental organ
Reggie Young – electric guitar
Arranged by Mike Leech

Afterlife of song
From September 2009, Neon Rainbow was featured in the TalkTalk TV advertising campaign, and is their hold music.

Chart performance

Billboard Hot 100 (9 weeks): Reached #24

Cashbox (10 weeks): 57, 43, 34, 27, 26, 24, 28, 44, 56, 58

References

External links
 .

1967 singles
Songs written by Wayne Carson
The Box Tops songs
1967 songs